Nadezhda Vasilyevna Pavlova (born 15 May 1956) is a Soviet and Russian ballet dancer. People's Artist of the USSR (1984).

Life and artistic output 
Nadia Pavlova liked to dance from an early age. At 7 she began to dance with a group at the House of Pioneers.

In 1966, visitors from the Perm State Choreographic College arrived in Cheboksary tasked with finding children of exceptional talent.

From the 2nd year Nadia Pavlova participated in concerts with the special numbers choreographed by  — «The Girl and an Echo», «The Little Ballerina», "Mischievous person", and also was cast in various children's parts at the Perm Opera and Ballet Theatre.

In 1970, during theater tours in Moscow, Nadia Pavlova was already noticed by reviewers. Aged 15 years was awarded the first prize in the All-Union competition of ballet masters and ballet dancers, and a year later, in 1973, she won the Grand prize of II . Nadia Pavlova was already frequently touring, both at home and abroad, to countries including Italy, Japan, China, Austria, Germany, France and the United States.

After graduation she became a soloist at the Perm Academic Opera and Ballet Theater of P. I. Tchaikovsky, where she was given roles including Giselle (in statement B.Scherbinin) and Juliet (Romeo and Juliet, ballet master N. Bojarchikov).

She joined the Bolshoi Ballet 1975. She was taught by Asaf Messerer and coached by Marina Semyonova.

She retired from the Bolshoi in 1998 after taking part in 3-5 performances a season there for the previous 4 years. She has given master-classes in France, Germany, Japan, Finland.

From 1992 to 1994 Pavlova was the artistic director of Theatre of Pavlova's ballet, and in 1995 the Renaissance-ballet. She has also served as a member of the jury in international dance competitions in Luxembourg (1995) and Hong Kong (1996).

In 1999, Pavlova took part in the opening of the Russian cultural center in Washington, as well as being a laureate of the Stars of World Ballet Festival in Donetsk.

Starting 2013 she coaches leading soloists in the Bolshoi Theater, and also teaches in the Russian Academy of Theatrical Art (RATA). She lives in Moscow.

Honors and awards 

 Lenin Komsomol Prize (1975)
 Order of the Badge of Honour (1976)
 Honored Artist of the RSFSR (1977)
 People's Artist of the RSFSR (1982)
 People's Artist of the USSR (1984)

Literature 
 С. Коробков «Путь в большой балет. Семь уроков в Пермском хореографическом училище». — Perm, 1989;
 Э. Бочарникова, Г. Иноземцева «Тем, кто любит балет», Moscow, 1988;
 А. Мессерер «Танец. Мысль. Время», Moscow, 1990;
 A. Demidov The Russian ballet: past & present. N.Y., 1977; London, 1982;
 S. Montague The ballerina, N.Y., 1980.
 М. Железкова «Надежда Павлова», Cheboksary, 1985, 1988.

Photo-albums 
 «Танцует Надежда Павлова», text A.Avdeenko, Perm, 1986.
 J. Gregory Giselle immortal: the story of Giselle as performed by Nadia Pavlova and Yuri Soloviev", London, 1982.

See also

 List of Russian ballet dancers

Notes

External links
ПАВЛОВА Надежда Васильевна
Nadezhda Pavlova, the ballerina gallery
Nadezhda Pavlova - Ballet Talk for Dancers

1956 births
People from Cheboksary
Perm State Choreographic College alumni
Prima ballerinas
Soviet ballerinas
Living people
Russian ballerinas
Bolshoi Ballet principal dancers
Recipients of the Lenin Komsomol Prize
Honored Artists of the RSFSR
People's Artists of the RSFSR
People's Artists of the USSR
20th-century Russian ballet dancers